, also known as , is a football stadium in Guatemala City, Guatemala. It serves as the training venue and home ground for CSD Municipal, one of the most traditional clubs in the country. The stadium has a capacity of 7,500.

A 2017 report by the National Football Federation of Guatemala found that the stadium was one of only four stadiums in Guatemala which met FIFA standards for security and infrastructure.

References

El Trebol